Arnica porsildiorum is an Arctic species of flowering plant in the family Asteraceae. It is native to Russia, Alaska, Northwest Territories and Yukon Territory.

References

porsildiorum
Flora of Russia
Flora of Subarctic America
Plants described in 1948